Dacula is a city in Gwinnett County, Georgia, United States. The population as of the 2010 census was 4,442, and the U.S. Census Bureau estimated the population to be 6,255 as of 2018.

History 
The vicinity of Dacula was one of the first areas in present-day metropolitan Atlanta to be claimed by settlers (around the time of the War of 1812), but the area remained mostly undeveloped until the late 20th century. The Dacula area is home to some of the oldest buildings in greater Atlanta, such as the Elisha Winn House, which originally acted as the courthouse for Gwinnett County. Dacula itself began in the late 1800s under the name of Chinquapin Grove, where Dacula Elementary now stands. The town was renamed named "Hoke", in 1891 after a Seaboard Air Line Railroad executive, but that name was changed due to the Post Office Department's protest. Dacula's name was formed from letters in Decatur and Atlanta, two cities to the west that were already prospering at the time of Dacula's founding. The city was once home to a train station on a CSX line through northeast Georgia, although the station closed in the mid-1950s.

Geography
Dacula is located in eastern Gwinnett County, with U.S. Route 29 Business/Georgia State Route 8 (Winder Highway) the main road through the center of town. Business 29/SR 8 leads west  to Lawrenceville, the county seat, and east  to Winder. U.S. Route 29 (University Parkway) is a four-lane highway that bypasses Dacula to the south, with access from Harbins Road.

The Dacula 30019 ZIP Code goes well beyond the city limits, resulting in mail delivery as far north as the unincorporated community of Hamilton Mill, south of Interstate 85.

Demographics

2020 census

As of the 2020 United States census, there were 6,882 people, 1,902 households, and 1,529 families residing in the city.

2010 census
As of 2010 Dacula had a population of 4,442.  the median age was 35.2.  There were 1,472 households with 92.0% of housing units occupied.  The racial and ethnic composition of the population was 76.6% white (70.3% non-Hispanic white), 11.3% black or African American, 0.3% Native American, 0.4% Asian Indian, 2.8% other Asian, 0.1% Pacific Islander, 5.4% from some other race (0.1% non-Hispanic from some other race) and 3.1% from two or more races.  13.6% of the population was Hispanic or Latino.

2000 census
As of the census of 2000, there were 3,848 people, 1,283 households, and 1,077 families residing in the city. The racial makeup of the city was 91.37% White, 4.24% African American, 0.34% Native American, 1.53% Asian, 0.03% Pacific Islander, 1.25% from other races, and 1.25% from two or more races. Hispanic or Latino of any race were 3.72% of the population.

There were 1,283 households, out of which 44.3% had children under the age of 18 living with them, 68.9% were married couples living together, 11.1% had a female householder with no husband present, and 16.0% were non-families. 12.5% of all households were made up of individuals, and 3.4% had someone living alone who was 65 years of age or older. 0.5% of all households were lesbian couples, and 0.2% of all households were gay male couples. The average household size was 3.00 and the average family size was 3.27.

In the city, the population was spread out, with 29.2% under the age of 18, 7.7% from 18 to 24, 36.9% from 25 to 44, 19.7% from 45 to 64, and 6.5% who were 65 years of age or older.  The median age was 33 years. For every 100 females, there were 96.2 males.  For every 100 females age 18 and over, there were 91.0 males.

The median income for a household in the city was $57,525, and the median income for a family was $58,603. Males had a median income of $40,616 versus $27,380 for females. The per capita income for the city was $19,720.  About 0.9% of families and 1.5% of the population were below the poverty line, including 1.0% of those under age 18 and 2.3% of those age 65 or over.

Dacula has experienced rapid growth, and with the addition of commercial businesses, commerce has exploded. A 2008 demographic study completed by the developers of the Dacula Town Center showed the population has increased greatly. According to the study, the population is now 31,466 in a 3-mile radius around Dacula. The same survey reveals that in a 5-mile radius within the 30019 zipcode the population is 82,719.

1900 census
In 1900, Dacula had a population of 120.

Government

Local government
The current mayor and council members are:
 Mayor: Trey King 
 Council Members: Ann Mitchell, Daniel Spain, and Sean Williams

Education
The county operates Gwinnett County Public Schools. The following GCPS schools have Dacula mail addresses:
Alcova Elementary School (Dacula cluster)
Dacula Elementary School (Dacula cluster)
Dyer Elementary School (Mountain View cluster)
Fort Daniel Elementary School (Mill Creek cluster)
Harbins Elementary School (Archer cluster)
Puckett's Mill Elementary School (Mill Creek Cluster)
Dacula Middle School (Dacula cluster)
Dacula High School (Dacula cluster)

Gwinnett County Public Library operates the Dacula and Hamilton Mill Branch in the nearby unincorporated area of Hamilton Mill.

Media
The town of Dacula is served by two newspapers: the Gwinnett Daily Post (based in nearby Lawrenceville) and the Hamilton Mill Neighborhood News.

Notable people 
 Donna Sheldon - Politician. Founder and former director of Dacula Classical Academy. Member of Georgia House of Representatives for District 71, 104 and 105.
 Roba Stanley - Country singer.
 Gid Tanner - Country singer.

References

External links
 
City of Dacula official website
Dacula at City-data.com

Cities in Georgia (U.S. state)
Cities in Gwinnett County, Georgia
Dacula